The passivation of a spacecraft is the removal of any internal energy contained in the vehicle at the end of its mission or useful life. Spent upper stages are generally passivated after their use as launch vehicles is complete, as are satellites when they can no longer be used for their design purpose.  

Internally stored energy generally takes the form of unused propellant and batteries. In the past, such stored energy has sometimes led to fragmentation or explosion, producing unwanted space debris.  This was a fairly common outcome for many of the U.S. and Soviet rocket designs of the 1960s to the 1980s. It remains an occasional problem with derelict second stages left in higher Earth orbits; several U.S. rocket stages fragmented in 2018 and 2019.

Most GEO satellites conform to these recommendations, although there are no enforcement mechanisms.

Standard practices
Within national regimes, where national governments can control the launch licenses of launch vehicles and spacecraft, there are some enforceable requirements for passivation.  

The U.S. government has a set of standard practices for civilian (NASA) and military (DoD/USSF) orbital debris mitigation that require passivation for space launches with U.S. launch licenses.  "All on-board sources of stored energy of a spacecraft or upper stage should be depleted or safed when they are no longer required for mission operations or postmission disposal. Depletion should occur as soon as such an operation does not pose an unacceptable risk to the payload. Propellant depletion burns and compressed gas releases should be designed to minimize the probability of subsequent accidental collision and to minimize the impact of a subsequent accidental explosion."

Passivation practice on many launches in recent decades has not mitigated second-stage breakups.  Upper stage deflagration/breakup events have continued even with newer rocket designs of the 2010s, long after the negative externality of space debris became widely considered as a much larger social problem.  For example, there were three upper-stage breakups in just the late 2010s:
 30 August 2018: Atlas V Centaur passivated second stage launched on 17 September 2014 broke up, creating space debris.
 23–25 March 2018: Atlas V Centaur passivated second stage launched on 8 September 2009 broke up.
 6 April 2019: Atlas V Centaur passivated second stage launched on 17 October 2018 broke up.

References

Spaceflight concepts
Spacecraft endings